Coop Marked is a chain of 384 local grocery stores throughout Norway managed by Coop Norge and owned by local cooperatives. The chain represents the smallest stores in the Coop range, and is predominantly used in rural areas too small to support Coop Prix stores.

Norwegian brands
Supermarkets of Norway
Coop Norden